Speedcubing (also known as speedsolving, or cubing) is a competitive sport involving solving a variety of combination puzzles, the most famous being the 3x3x3 puzzle or Rubik's Cube, as quickly as possible. A person who practices solving twisty puzzles is known as a speedcuber (when solved specifically focusing on speed), or a cuber. For most puzzles, solving involves performing a series of moves or sequences that alters a scrambled puzzle into a solved state, in which every face of the puzzle is a single, solid color.

Competitive speedcubing is mainly regulated by the World Cube Association (WCA). The WCA currently recognizes 17 speedcubing events: the cubic puzzles from the 2x2–7x7, the Pyraminx, Megaminx, Skewb, Square-1, and Rubik's Clock, as well as the 3x3, 4x4, and 5x5 Blindfolded, 3x3 One-handed, 3x3 Fewest Moves, and 3x3 Multi-blind.

, the 3x3x3 world record single in competition is 3.47 seconds by Yusheng Du in the Wuhu Open 2018. The 3x3x3 world record for a trimmed average of five solves is 4.69 seconds, set by Yiheng Wang, a 9 year old cubing prodigy from China.

History
The Rubik's Cube was invented in 1974 by Hungarian professor of architecture Ernő Rubik (Born 13 July 1944). In 1979, Ernő Rubik partnered with Ideal Toy Company to garner widespread international interest in the cube, which soon developed into a global trend. On June 5, 1982, the first world championship was held in Budapest, Hungary. Nineteen people competed in the event, and the American Minh Thai won with a single solve time of 22.95 seconds, which was, at the time, the fastest Rubik's Cube solve ever recorded in competition. Other notable attendees include Jessica Fridrich and Lars Petrus, both people who later became influential in the development of solving methods and the speedcubing community. The Rubik's Cube waned in popularity after 1983, but with the advent of the Internet, sites began to surface to discuss the cube. With these websites facilitating the renewed popularity of the cube, it ushered in a new generation of cubers, creating a growing international community of people dedicated to the sport of speedsolving.

Those prominent in the online community such as Ron van Bruchem, Tyson Mao, Chris Hardwick, and Ton Dennenbroek eventually wanted to create a place where cubers from around the world can meet and compete. In 2003 they organized a second championship in Toronto, Ontario followed by another competition in the Netherlands later that same year. This revival of competition sparked a new wave of organized speedcubing events, which included regular national and international competitions. There were twelve competitions in 2004, 58 more from 2005 to 2006, over 100 in 2008, and over 1150 in 2018. Since Budapest's 1982 competition, there have been nine further World Championships traditionally held every other year, the most recent in Melbourne, Australia. This new wave of speedcubing competitions has been and still is organized by the World Cube Association (WCA).

Since speedcubing's rise in popularity, numerous entrepreneurial ventures have sprung up, specializing in either the making or selling of speedcubes, creating international competition between these brands and Rubik's. Dozens of cube manufacturers have begun improving the cube's technology to allow for smoother turning and faster solving. This has helped to facilitate the eventual rise of the Rubik's Cube as not just a toy, but also a lucrative business.

Solving methods
The standard 3x3x3 can be solved using a number of methods, not all of which are intended for speedcubing. Although some speedsolving methods (such as CFOP) employ a layer-by-layer system in tandem with algorithms, other significant (though less widely used) methods include corners-first methods and the Roux method. CFOP, Roux, and ZZ are known as the "Big 3" methods, as they are the most popular and can be used to achieve the fastest times. The "Big 3" used to be a "Big 4", previously including the Petrus method, but this method has waned in popularity in recent years. The CFOP method is used by the majority of today's speedcubers.

CFOP method

The CFOP (Abbreviation for Cross – F2L – OLL – PLL) method, also known as the Fridrich method, was named after one of its inventors, Jessica Fridrich, who finished second in the 2003 Rubik's Cube World Championships. Although it is known as the Fridrich method, its origins are actually credited to David Singmaster, who was one of the first to publish a layer-by-layer method of solving in 1980, and Guus Razoux Schultz, who built upon this and developed a more efficient system for the first two layers (F2L). Jessica Fridrich then finished developing the method and published it online in 1997, an event that was very influential in the revival of competitive speedcubing. The first step of the method is to solve a cross-shaped arrangement of edge pieces on the first layer. The remainder of the first layer and all of the second layer are then solved together in what is referred to as "corner-edge pairs", or slots. Finally, the last layer is solved in two steps – first, all of the pieces in the layer are oriented to form a solid color (but without the individual pieces always being in their correct places on the cube). This step is referred to as orientation and is usually performed with a single set of algorithms known as OLL (Orientation of Last Layer). Then, all of those pieces are permuted to their correct spots. This is also usually performed as a single set of algorithms known as PLL (Permutation of Last Layer). OLL and PLL use 57 algorithms and 21 algorithms, respectively.

The CFOP method can be used as a less advanced method by dividing the steps into more steps, reducing the number of algorithms that needs to be learned but sacrificing time. Most people start learning CFOP with 4LLL (Four-Look Last Layer), which is the less advanced, slower, and algorithm-reducing (from 78 algorithms to 16) way to learn CFOP. The 4 steps are divided into Edge Orientation, Corner Orientation, Corner Permutation, and Edge Permutation (can be called EO, CO, CP and EP). Later on, full OLL which has 57 Algorithms, and full PLL, which has 21 Algorithms, can be learned. An average CFOP solve with Full OLL and PLL along with an efficient cross (which takes 8 moves at maximum) and efficient F2L (takes almost 30 moves) consists of 55-60 moves, which means that it has a higher move count than Roux and ZZ. However, finger tricks and Algorithms are more researched with CFOP than any other method which explains why the majority of the fastest speedcubers use CFOP as their main speedcubing method.

The CFOP method is the most widely used speedsolving method. It is a more efficient version of the Layer-By-Layer method (also known as the beginner's method). It is very popular due to the vast amount of resources that teach and improve upon the CFOP method. Many fast speedcubers, including two-time World Champion Feliks Zemdegs and world record holder Max Park  learn additional sets of algorithms for the last slot and layer, such as Corners of Last Layer (COLL), which orients and permutes the corners when the edges are oriented, or Winter Variation (WV), which finishes OLL while inserting the last pair and ZBLL, which combines the solving process of OLL and PLL in only 1 Algorithm.

Roux method
The Roux method was invented by French speedcuber Gilles Roux. The first step of the Roux method is to form a 3×2×1 block usually placed in the lower portion of the left layer. The second step is to create another 3×2×1 on the opposite side, such that each block shares a bottom color. The creation of these blocks is commonly known as "blockbuilding". The remaining four corners are then solved using a set of algorithms known as CMLL (Corners of the Last Layer, without regard to the M-slice), which leaves six edges and four centers that are solved in the last step, L6E or LSE (Last Six Edges).

This method is not as dependent on algorithm memorization as the CFOP method since all but the third step is done with intuition as opposed to predefined sets of algorithms. Because of the frequent use of M moves, the Roux method can be performed without any rotations (unlike the CFOP method) which means it is easier to look ahead (solving a collection of pieces while at the same time looking for the solution to the next step) while solving. It is also considered one of the most efficient speedsolving methods with its average move count being between 45 and 50 moves for experienced solvers. However, the Roux method of speedcubing has been criticized over the years because, unlike CFOP, ZZ or Petrus, Roux requires M (middle) slices to solve the LSE. Using M slice moves makes it harder to achieve higher TPS (turns per second) because the fingertricks are almost always flicks, but high TPS is achievable through training. Because of its low move count, it is often considered one of the best speedsolving methods.

One of the users of this method, Kian Mansour, had broken the one-handed (OH) world-record average with a time of 9.54 seconds. Sean Patrick Villanueva is the first Roux user to achieve a Sub-6 average of five in competition and is ranked eighth in the world by 3x3 average. He also podiumed in 3x3 at the WCA World Championship 2019 (2nd Place).

ZZ method
The ZZ method (short for "Zbigniew Zborowski") is a modern speedcubing method originally proposed by Zbigniew Zborowski in 2006. The method was designed specifically to achieve high turning speed by focusing on move ergonomics and is the combination of a block-building method and a layer-by-layer method. The initial pre-planned step is called EOLine and is the most distinctive hallmark of the ZZ method. It involves orienting all edges while placing two oppositely placed down-face edges aligned with the correspondingly colored center. It is also common to build an EOCross, where all edges are oriented and the four bottom edges are put in their place, similar to CFOP. The next step solves the remaining first two layers using only left, right, top and bottom face turns, one of the advantages of ZZ. On completion of the first two layers, the last layer's edges are all correctly oriented because of edge pre-orientation during EOLine. The last layer may be completed using a number of techniques including those used in the CFOP method. An expert variant of this method, ZBLL (Zborowski-Bruchem Last Layer) allows the last layer to be completed in a single step with an average of just over 12 moves, but requires a total of 493 algorithms to be learned. Due to the ergonomics of ZZ, rotating when solving will never be needed, unlike in the CFOP method. The ZZ method has fewer moves than CFOP, with ZZ averaging 45-55 compared to CFOP's 55-60 moves. Because ZZ uses EO and block building, it is very move-efficient, these techniques are used in FMC (Fewest Move Challenge). However, EOLine is considered by many to be more difficult than F2L, with only two edges solved (the front and back bottom edges), which can hinder lookahead and TPS (turns per second), making ZZ much slower than CFOP.

Corners-first methods
Corners-first methods involve solving the corners and then finishing the edges with slice turns. Corners-first solutions were common in the 1980s and were one of the most popular methods that 1982 world champion Minh Thai used. Currently, corners-first solutions are rarely used among speedsolvers. Dutch cuber Marc Waterman created a corners-first method in the cube craze and averaged 18 seconds in the mid-late 1980s.

Fewest Moves Challenge (FMC) methods
At the highest level, there typically is not a standard method used for Fewest Moves solving. Rather, competitors attempt to solve the cube intuitively using solving techniques such as blockbuilding, Normal-Inverse-Scramble-Swap (NISS), commutator insertions, and Domino Reduction after its rise to popularity in 2019. Most solves utilize multiple of these techniques in order to generate a solution.

Blindfolded methods
In 2003, when the first blindfolded competitions were organized, world record solvers would use the 3OP (3-Cycle Orientation Permutation) Method, which orients and then permutes pieces using 3 cycles. As of today, methods such as 3-Style and M2 are among the fastest and most popular blind-solving methods. The Old Pochmann Method, which is a method that solves one piece at a time, is a method typically used by beginner blindsolvers. Blindfolded solvers use letter patterns to help memorize sequences of moves in order to solve the cube.

The lettering scheme that blindfolded solvers use is called the Speffz lettering scheme, and each sticker or individual color is given a letter. The way letters are assigned is starting on the top edge of the top face, going clockwise, and starting with A. The top edge of the top face is A, the right edge is B, the bottom edge is C, and the left edge is D. The same process is done on the other sides in the order top, left, front, right, back, bottom to get every edge lettered from A to X. The same process is applied to all of the corners, starting with the top left corner and going clockwise in the same face order. A cycle of piece swaps is then used with the letter E being used as a buffer location for corners and D commonly being used for edges in the Old Pochmann method.

Competitions

World Cube Association (WCA)

Speedcubing competitions have been held every year since 2003. The World Cube Association (WCA) was formed in 2004 to govern all official competitions. For a competition to be official, it must be approved by the WCA and follow the WCA regulations. Included in the regulations is the necessity of having one or more WCA delegate in attendance. A delegate's main role is to ensure all regulations are followed during the competition. Once the competition is finished, results are uploaded to the WCA website. Judges oversee the round. Delegates help the judge.  Runners give the scrambled or solved cube to the competitor. A scrambler scrambles the cube.

Format
The majority of puzzle competitions are held using a trimmed mean of five format. This involves the competitor executing five solves in the round in question, after which the fastest and slowest solve are disregarded and the mean of the remaining three is used. The 6×6×6 and 7×7×7 events are ranked by straight mean of three — only three solves, none of which are disregarded. In 3×3×3 blindfolded and 3×3×3 fewest moves challenges, either straight mean of 3 or best of 3 is used, while 4×4×4 blindfolded, 5×5×5 blindfolded, and multiple blindfolded challenges are ranked using best of 1, 2 or 3, depending on the competition.

When a round begins, competitors hand in the puzzle they will use. Puzzles are scrambled using a computer-generated scramble. Each round, five, three or one (depending on the format, mentioned above) scrambles are used. Every competitor in the round will receive each scramble once. Before starting a solve, a competitor has up to 15 seconds to inspect the puzzle (inspection is removed for blindfolded events). This is monitored by a judge with a stopwatch. Once the solve is complete, the judge records the time on the competitor's scorecard and it is signed by both. If the puzzle is unsolved and the timer is stopped, the time is recorded as "DNF" (Did Not Finish). There are also numerous reasons why the solve can receive a two-second addition to the solve time, such as a face being more than 45 degrees off, or the competitor going over the allowed inspection time. A competitor can also receive an extra solve to replace the one just completed, for example in the case of a timer malfunction or a duplicate scramble.

The official timer used in competitions is the StackMat timer. This device has touch-sensitive pads that are triggered by the user lifting one or both of their hands to start the time and placing both their hands back on the pads after releasing the puzzle to stop the timer.

Official competitions are currently being held in several categories.

Competitions will often include events for speedsolving other puzzles as well, such as:
Pyraminx, a pyramid shaped puzzle.
Megaminx, an twelve sided puzzle similar to a 3x3x3.
Skewb, a cube shaped puzzle.
Square-1, a cubed puzzle that changes shape as it is solved
Rubik's Clock, a double sided circle shaped puzzle with many clocks on it that is considered solved when all clock hands are in the 12 o'clock position.

World Rubik's Cube Championships
The WCA organizes the Rubik's Cube World Championship as the main international competition once every two years. The latest championship was held in Melbourne, Australia from 11 to 14 July 2019.

World records
The following are the official speedcubing world records approved by the WCA.

Note: For averages of 5 solves, the best time and the worst time are dropped, and the mean of the remaining 3 solves is taken. When only 3 solves are done, the mean of all 3 is taken.

Lubrication
Members of the cubing community lubricate their cubes to allow them to be manipulated faster, easier, smoother, and more reliably than a non-lubricated cube. The WCA allows lubrication for official competitions.

A lubricant’s MSDS indicates potential cube-damaging properties. Cube lubricants normally belong to the silicone family of lubrication because these are less likely to damage the cube.

There are also water-based lubes that usually dry out faster but sometimes can be faster. Also, there are plant-based lubes, they can also be fast, but it's advised to use them faster because they can spoil.

Terminology
Below are some definitions of words generally used by the speedcubing community. For a more complete list of speedcubing terminology, see the cubefreak.net glossary.

 One Look Last Layer. A set of 3915 algorithms to solve every possible state that the last layer could be in after completing F2L.  The average optimal move count is 12.58.
Algorithm  A predefined sequence of moves used to effect a specific change on the cube. Often referred to as alg or (less commonly) an algo.
AUF  Often the final move of a solve, the AUF (adjust U face) is when, after the top layer is solved, it has to be moved to avoid a +2. 
BLD Blindfolded solving, i.e. memorize, put on the blindfold, then solve.
 Centerpiece One of the centers of the faces of the cube. The centers never move relative to each other on an NxNxN cube, where N is odd. On NxNxN cubes where N>3, every piece with only one sticker is referred to as a 'center piece', including those pieces that can move relative to each other.
CLL  Corners of the Last Layer. This is the first of two steps of one of the methods of solving the last layer of the cube. In the process, edges may be unoriented. This is used in Corners First methods for the last layer, in which first all corners are solved, followed by the edges (see ELL). CLL is also commonly used to solve the last layer of a 2x2x2 cube in one step.
Commutator  A commutator is a sequence of form A B A' B' (also represented as [A:B] or [A,B] which affects only specific portions of the cube, leaving the rest untouched. This is used in Blindfolded solving and Fewest Moves Competition. It is also a method used to create algorithms.
Corner piece  One of the 8 pieces with exactly three colors, called a "corner" piece because a corner is exposed.
Corner twist  If a solve is finished with one corner twisted around, the solve is considered null. This is called a corner twist. 
CR  Short for Continental Record (e.g. Record for a continent). Can also be "Continental Rank" when referring to the rank of a person's record in a database.
Cuber  Someone who solves a Rubik's cube, any of its other sizes, and/or other shaped puzzles.
  One of the mechanically independent pieces that make up a puzzle. The cubies do not include fixed center pieces, the central axis to which they are attached, or any other internal pieces (Such as the internal edges of a 4x4 or 2x2).
Cycle  To rotate pieces' positions on the cube. e.g. a 3-cycle would make cubie set A-B-C become C-A-B.
  Initialism for Did Not Finish, used in competitions and self-timing. e.g. when a piece pop occurs and the competitor decides not to continue solving the puzzle, or when the solver stops the timer and the puzzle is 2 or more turns away from being solved.
  Did Not Start, used in competition when the competitor does not begin a solve, either by opting to skip it (common in Blindfold Cubing), by not showing up when he or she is called, or not qualifying for the remaining (usually three) solves of a certain round.
Edge piece  One of the 12 pieces with exactly two colors, called an "edge" piece because only one edge is exposed.
  Edges of the Last Layer. The second of two steps of one of the methods of solving the last layer of the cube, solving the edge pieces without disturbing the corner pieces (see CLL).
  Edge Permutation of the Last Layer, specifically refers to the PLL cases in which only edges must be permuted to solve the cube.
 First two blocks. This is used in the Roux method.
F2L  First two layers. This is used in the CFOP (Fridrich), Petrus, and ZZ methods.
Finger trick Techniques that cubers use to turn the cube quickly. Rather than turning a layer with the whole hand, only a finger is used.
FMC  Fewest move challenge. A WCA event in which all competitors are given a scramble, and the competitors have one hour to find the solution to the scramble with as little turns as possible (the competitors are not allowed to just use the inverse of the scramble)
L3C/L4C  Last 3 Corners/Last 4 Corners
Layer  One section of a cube consisting of a number of cubies that turn as a unit. (e.g. A standard Rubik's Cube has 3 layers.)
LL  Last Layer. Usually refers to the top layer of the cube, but for the Roux method can refer to the middle layer between the left and right faces.
LLEF  Last Layer Edges First. This is a variation of ELL (Edges of the Last Layer), but it ignores the corners. Has fewer moves and cases then the normal ELL, and after that is L4C.
MethodA combination of steps that can be used to solve a cube.
MoveA turn of one of the sides of a puzzle or knobs in the case of the clock.
N-look, also known as X-LookRefers to the maximum number of iterations of algorithms necessary to complete a step in a particular solving method, often the last layer, e.g. '4-look LL'.
NRShort for National Record (e.g. a record for a country). Can also be "National Rank" when referring to the rank of a person's record in a database.
OHShort for One-Handed, it is the event or practice of solving a cube with one hand, left or right.
OLLOrientation of the Last Layer, usually used in reference to the respective step of the CFOP and ZZ methods.
Orientation of the Last Layer with Corner Permutation.  An advanced technique where multiple algorithms are learned for one OLL case, in order to use one that will solve the case while also permuting the corners, which results in an easy PLL case.
OrientTo change the orientation of a piece.
PBPersonal Best – personal record time to solve a puzzle. This can either be a single attempt or a trimmed average, depending on context.
PRPersonal Record – the personal record time to solve a puzzle achieved in competition.
PermuteTo relocate certain pieces in a way to achieve the desired result.
PLLPermutation of the Last Layer. Usually used in reference to the respective step of the CFOP and ZZ methods, in which case it would follow the OLL step.
PopWhen, during a solve, one or more cubies come out of contact with the puzzle, usually causing the puzzle to be unstable, in which, upon turning, more pieces may become loose and possibly pop out too.
PrimeA counter-clockwise move popularly denoted with a ', e.g. 'R-Prime', denoted as R', R-, or Ri. Also (less commonly) known as "inverse" or "inverted".
SliceThe four center pieces and four edge pieces between two opposite layers of the cube.  On a cube with four or more layers, it refers to any of the layers of the puzzle that don't have corner pieces. Also refers '/' moves in Square-1 puzzles.
A puzzle that uses colored plastic instead of stickers to indicate color. Most stickerless puzzles were forbidden in competitions prior to a 2015 update of WCA regulations.
A subset of algorithms for F2L that allows the user to force all upper-face corners to be oriented correctly, or an OLL-Skip, while the last F2L pair can be solved with R U R' or L' U' L.
SQ-1Abbreviation for Square-1. Sometimes used as 'Squan'.
Turns per second – the number count of turns per second indicating how fast the cuber turns.
, also known as +2A penalty of 2 seconds which is added to a solving time in official competitions when the cube is placed back on the timing pad with one or more faces misaligned 45 degrees or more. It can also be given in other cases, such as when the competitor starts the timer too slow or does not correctly stop the timer after finishing the solve.
 The world's fastest time for a puzzle to be solved in an unofficial (non WCA) event.
 Valk Last Slot. A set of 432 algorithms (216 if mirrors are not counted), that solves together the last F2L pair and all of OLL when this last F2L pair is already paired up.
WBThe world's fastest time for a puzzle to be solved. This can either be a single attempt or a trimmed average, depending on context, and does not need to be achieved at an official WCA competition. This usually has to be done on trust since verifying someone's solve they did at home which was not recorded is not really possible, although someone who has never officially competed claiming to have solved a 3x3x3 in under 3 seconds is unlikely to be believed.
 WCA  World Cube Association, the international governing body for official cube competitions.
, also known as WV A subset of algorithms for VLS that allows the user to force all upper-face corners to be oriented correctly, or an OLL-Skip, while the last F2L pair is already formed. It is used when the last F2L pair (One corner and its corresponding edge correctly positioned relative to each other) to be inserted is in the top layer, with the 3 top-layer edges oriented correctly. There are a total of 27 cases. WV has an average lower move count than the standard OLL.
 Short for World Record (e.g. Record for the world). The fastest time in the world for a puzzle to be solved at a WCA competition. Can also be "World Rank" when referring to the rank of a person's record in a database. 
 Completing one or multiple F2L pairs during the cross setup, used almost exclusively in the CFOP method.
  YouTube Unofficial World Record; the world's fastest time to solve a puzzle that is posted on YouTube, but not having been done at an official WCA competition.
  ZBLL, short for Zborowski-Bruchem Last Layer (often shortened to ZB), is a set of 177 algorithms (Not including mirrors and inverses) with 493 cases to recognize in order to solve the last layer in one look while all of the top edges are oriented with an average move count of ~12.08. Can be used in any layer-by-layer method that ends in N-Look LL, but will only really be efficient in ZZ and Petrus, as these methods keep edges oriented, whereas methods such as CFOP do not keep the edges oriented, becoming a sometimes 2LLL solve.

Notable people
 

Jessica Fridrich
Max Park
Lars Petrus
Jeff Varasano
Feliks Zemdegs

See also
World Cube Association
Ernő Rubik
Rubik's Cube
Rubik's Revenge
Professor's Cube
CFOP method

Notes
Postponed to 28–31 December 2020 and later canceled due to the COVID-19 pandemic.

References

External links
Speedsolving.com
Speedsolving.com Wiki
Fridrich Method
Roux Method
ZZ Method
JPerm
World Cube Association
Five Steps to Solve the Rubiks Cube
How To Solve The Rubiks Cube Fast
SpeedCubeShop
TheCubicle
SpeedCube Australia
DailyPuzzles
CubeSkills
CsTimer

Mechanical puzzles
Rubik's Cube
Articles containing video clips